The Ministry of War of the Republic of China was the cabinet level department charged with administering the Army of the Chinese Republic from 1912-1946.

Organizational structure 
The Ministry of War supervised:
 General Affairs Department
 Military Affairs Service
 Quartermaster Service
 Ordnance Service
 Medical Service

Ministers of War 
 Feng Yuxiang (馮玉祥): 1928–1929
 Lu Zhonglin (鹿鍾麟): 1929
 Chen Yi (陳儀): 1929
 Lu Zhonglin (鹿鍾麟): 1929
 Zhu Shouguang (朱綬光): 1929–1930
 He Yingqin (何應欽): 1930 - 1944 
 Chen Cheng (陳誠): 1944 - 1945

See also 
 Imperial Chinese Ministry of War
 Ministry of National Defense of the Republic of China
 National Revolutionary Army

References 

 Hsu Long-hsuen and Chang Ming-kai, History of The Sino-Japanese War (1937-1945) 2nd Ed., 1971. Translated by Wen Ha-hsiung, Chung Wu Publishing; 33, 140th Lane, Tung-hwa Street, Taipei, Taiwan Republic of China. p. 215

Former defence ministries
National Revolutionary Army